Buda (Czech and) was the historic capital of the Kingdom of Hungary and since 1873 has been the western part of the Hungarian capital Budapest, on the west bank of the Danube. Buda comprises a third of Budapest's total territory and is mostly wooded. Landmarks include Buda Castle, the Citadella, and the president of Hungary's residence, Sándor Palace.

Etymology 

According to a legend recorded in chronicles from the Middle Ages, the name "Buda" comes from the name of Bleda, brother of Hunnic ruler Attila.

Demographics 

The Buda fortress and palace were built by King Béla IV of Hungary in 1247, and were the nucleus around which the town of Buda was built, which soon gained great importance, and became in 1361 the capital of Hungary.

While Pest was mostly Hungarian in the 15th century, Buda had a German majority; however according to the Hungarian Royal Treasury, it had a Hungarian majority with a sizeable German minority in 1495. Buda became part of Ottoman-ruled central Hungary from 1541 to 1686. It was the capital of the province of Budin during the Ottoman era. By the middle of the seventeenth century Buda had become majority Muslim, largely resulting from an influx of Balkan Muslims.

In 1686, two years after the unsuccessful siege of Buda, a renewed European campaign was started to enter Buda, which was formerly the capital of medieval Hungary. This time, the Holy League's army was twice as large, containing over 74,000 men, including German, Dutch, Hungarian, English, Spanish, Czech, French, Croat, Burgundian, Danish and Swedish soldiers, along with other Europeans as volunteers, artillerymen, and officers, the Christian forces reconquered Buda (see Siege of Buda).

After the reconquest of Buda, bourgeoisie from different parts of southern Germany moved into the almost deserted city. Germans — also clinging to their language — partly crowded out, partly assimilated the Hungarians and Serbians they had found here. As the rural population moved into Buda, in the 19th century slowly Hungarians became the majority there.

Notable residents 

 Andrew III of Hungary, (ca.1265–1301) King of Hungary and Croatia, 1290 to 1301, buried in the Greyfriars' Church, a Franciscan church in Buda
 Jadwiga of Poland, (ca.1373–1399), born in Buda, first female monarch of the Kingdom of Poland
 John Corvinus (1473–1504) illegitimate son of Matthias Corvinus, King of Hungary, and his mistress, Barbara Edelpöck.
 Louis II of Hungary (1506–1526) King of Hungary, Croatia and Bohemia from 1516 to 1526.
 Aaron ben Joseph of Buda (ca. 1686), poet
 Mihail G. Boiagi, (1780 – ca.1842) an Aromanian grammarian and professor
 László Szalay (1813–1864) a Hungarian statesman and historian.
 József Eötvös (1813–1871) a Hungarian writer and statesman.
 Ignaz Philipp Semmelweis (1818–1865), a Hungarian physician and scientist. An early pioneer of antiseptic procedures, he proposed doctors start the practice of washing hands.
 Kornelije Stanković, (1831–1865) notable Serbian composer, born and died in Buda
 Edmund Hauler (1859–1941), classicist and philologist

Twin cities 
 Capestrano, Italy

Gallery

See also 
 Pest
 Óbuda
 Buda Castle

References

Further reading

External links 

 Drawings of Castle Buda over the centuries

 
Geography of Budapest
History of Budapest
Former capitals of Hungary
Former municipalities of Hungary